John Baird is a former racing cyclist from New Zealand.

He won the silver medal in the men's road race at the 1954 British Empire Games in Vancouver.

References

Possibly living people
New Zealand male cyclists
Commonwealth Games silver medallists for New Zealand
Cyclists at the 1954 British Empire and Commonwealth Games
Year of birth missing
Place of birth missing (living people)
Commonwealth Games medallists in cycling
Medallists at the 1954 British Empire and Commonwealth Games